i2 Analyst's Notebook is a software product from i2 Group for data analysis. Based on ELP (entity-link-property) methodology, it reveals relationships between data entities to discover patterns and provide insight into data. It is commonly used by digital analysts at law enforcement, military and other government intelligence agencies, and by fraud departments. It is a part of the Human Terrain System, a United States Army program which embeds social scientists with combat brigades. Several investigations, including an investigation into fraud in the U.S. Army, are reported to have used it. It is also used by Swedish police to analyse social contacts and social networks.

IBM acquired i2 Analyst's Notebook when it bought the i2 Group.

See also 
 List of concept- and mind-mapping software

References

External links
 .
 i2accelerate. "World Leading Intelligence Analysis – Analyst's Notebook 8.5", YouTube, 25 September 2010. Retrieved 10 November 2013.

Data analysis software
Mind-mapping software